Patrick Larkin may refer to:

 Patrick Larkin (novelist) (fl. 1980s–1990s), American novelist
 Patrick Larkin (hurler) (1866–1917), Irish hurler
 Patrick Larkin (politician) (1829–1900), ship's captain, businessman and politician

See also
Patrick Larkins (1860–1918), Major League Baseball third baseman